The Amy Chouest is an offshore supply vessel.  She was chartered, for a time, by the United States Government, which used her as a research vessel.  She was struck by an explosion, in 1992, that killed two researchers.

The Amy Chouest was chartered to supplement the Cory Chouest, a similar vessel on a long term charter to conduct research that used very loud underwater noises.  Sounds in the range 10,000,000 joules were used.  The Amy Chouest was chartered to research the impact of the massive noise on marine life.

The two deaths occurred on March 11, 1992.  The two men, Mike Sinclair, and Lee Roy Burks, worked for Marine Specialty, a firm hired to carry out some of the research.  A depth charge accidentally exploded on deck, killing the men, but without causing significant damage to the ship.

Ian Anderson, writing in New Scientist, reported that environmental activists were concerned the loud noises would deafen marine animals.

United Press International speculated that the deaths occurred during an experiment that included the covert involvement of Trident submarines, based on initial Navy reports that said that submarines hadn't surfaced, or fired any weapons, at the time of the explosion.

References

Research vessels of the United States
1979 ships